The M. Riesz extension theorem is a theorem in mathematics, proved by Marcel Riesz during his study of the problem of moments.

Formulation
Let  be a real vector space,  be a vector subspace, and  be a convex cone.

A linear functional   is called -positive, if it takes only non-negative values on the cone :

Already in two dimensions one obtains a counterexample. Let  and  be the -axis.

However, the extension exists under the additional assumption that  namely for every  there exists an  such that

Proof
The proof is similar to the proof of the Hahn–Banach theorem (see also below).

By transfinite induction or Zorn's lemma it is sufficient to consider the case dim .

Choose any . Set

We will prove below that . We need to show that  is -positive. Suppose . If , then . In the first remaining case , and so

by definition. Thus

In the second case, and so similarly

by definition and so

In all cases, and so  is -positive.

We now prove that . Indeed,

since  is a convex cone, and so

since  is -positive.

Corollary: Krein's extension theorem

Let E be a real linear space, and let K ⊂ E be a convex cone. Let x ∈ E\(−K) be such that R x + K = E. Then there exists a K-positive linear functional φ: E → R such that φ(x) > 0.

Connection to the Hahn–Banach theorem

The Hahn–Banach theorem can be deduced from the M. Riesz extension theorem.

Let V be a linear space, and let N be a sublinear function on V. Let φ be a functional on a subspace U ⊂ V that is dominated by N:

The Hahn–Banach theorem asserts that φ can be extended to a linear functional on V that is dominated by N.

To derive this from the M. Riesz extension theorem, define a convex cone K ⊂ R×V by

Define a functional φ1 on R×U by

One can see that φ1 is K-positive, and that K + (R × U) = R × V. Therefore φ1 can be extended to a K-positive functional ψ1 on R×V. Then

is the desired extension of φ. Indeed, if ψ(x) > N(x), we have: (N(x), x) ∈ K, whereas

leading to a contradiction.

Notes

References
 
 
 

Theorems in convex geometry
Theorems in functional analysis